Roberto Sanchez (born May 5, 1986) is an American mixed martial artist  (MMA) and he competes in the Flyweight division of the Ultimate Fighting Championship (UFC).

Background 
Sanchez was born in the city of Houston, Texas.  His first combat sport experience started with BJJ at the age of eighteen, serving as a training partner for  his brother to test out the new moves which his brother had learned, when he was eighteen years old. After graduating with a Bachelor of Science of Mathematics in 2012, Sanchez took up a job as a Mathematics teacher in high school. He later took a hiatus from long hours teaching career to concentrate on training and competing in MMA. Today, he works  full-time as an actuarial analyst for an insurance company and competes MMA professionally.

Mixed martial arts career

Early career 
Sanchez made his professional debut in 2015. He was featured in the debut episode of Dana White's Looking For A Fight web series Session 1, Episode 5. After amassed a record of 8-0, he was signed by UFC.

Ultimate Fighting Championship 
Sanchez made his promotional debut on August 5, 2017 at UFC Fight Night: Pettis vs. Moreno, facing Joseph Morales.  He lost the fight via a rear-naked choke in round one.

His next fight came February 18, 2018 against Joby Sanchez at  UFC Fight Night: Cowboy vs. Medeiros. He won the fight via submission in round one.

On September 8, 2018, Sanchez faced Ryan Benoit  at UFC 228. However, it was reported that Benoit pulled out from the event for undisclosed reason and he was replaced by Jarred Brooks. He lost the fight via split decision.

On November 8, 2018, it was reported that Sanchez was released from UFC.

Personal life 
Sanchez works a full-time job as an actuarial analyst and he worked as a high school mathematics teach and special education teach prior starting competing MMA professionally.

Mixed martial arts record 

|-
|Loss
|align=center|8–2
|Jarred Brooks
|Decision (split)
|UFC 228
|
|align=center|3
|align=center|5:00
|Dallas, Texas, United States
|
|-
|Win
|align=center|8–1
|Joby Sanchez
|Submission (rear-naked choke)
|UFC Fight Night: Cowboy vs. Medeiros
|
|align=center|1
|align=center|1:50
|Austin, Texas, United States
|
|-
|Loss
|align=center|7–1
|Joseph Morales
|Submission (rear-naked choke)
|UFC Fight Night: Pettis vs. Moreno
|
|align=center|1
|align=center|3:56
|Mexico City, Mexico
|
|-
|Win
|align=center|7–0
|Jerome Rivera
|Submission (armbar)
|Legacy Fighting Alliance 14
|
|align=center|3
|align=center|3:41
|Houston, Texas, United States
|
|-
|Win
|align=center|6–0
|Klayton Mai
|Submission (rear-naked choke)
|Legacy Fighting Alliance 7
|
|align=center|2
|align=center|2:08
|Houston, Texas, United States
|
|-
|Win
|align=center|5–0
|David Waters
|Submission (rear-naked choke)
|Legacy Fighting Championship 55
|
|align=center|1
|align=center|3:19
|Houston, Texas, United States
|
|-
|Win
|align=center|4–0
|David Acosta
|Submission (rear-naked choke)
|Legacy Fighting Championship 50
|
|align=center|3
|align=center|4:25
|Houston, Texas, United States
|
|-
|Win
|align=center|3–0
|Mike DeLeon
|Submission (rear-naked choke)
|Legacy Fighting Championship 44
|
|align=center|1
|align=center|N/A
|Houston, Texas, United States
|
|-
|Win
|align=center|2–0
|Trent Meaux
|Submission (armbar)
|Legacy Fighting Championship 42
|
|align=center|1
|align=center|1:40
|Lake Charles, Louisiana, United States
|
|-
|Win
|align=center|1–0
|Jacob Silva
|Decision (unanimous)
|Legacy Fighting Championship 39
|
|align=center|3
|align=center|5:00
|Houston, Texas, United States
|
|-

See also 
 List of current UFC fighters
 List of male mixed martial artists

References

External links 
 
 
 
 

1986 births
Living people
American male mixed martial artists
Flyweight mixed martial artists
Mixed martial artists utilizing Brazilian jiu-jitsu
Sportspeople from Houston
Ultimate Fighting Championship male fighters
American practitioners of Brazilian jiu-jitsu